The  were a class of two heavy cruisers constructed for the Imperial Japanese Navy (IJN) which saw service during World War II.

Design
The  of heavy cruisers (also called "A class" cruisers in the Imperial Japanese Navy) was originally planned to include  and her sister ship . The two ships were laid down in early 1924 with that intent.

In 1924 the IJN Naval General Staff pressured the acting head of the Basic Design Section, Kikuo Fujimoto, to use the newly designed twin  "type C" gun turrets on the Furutaka-class ships. The two ships were subsequently renamed as a separate class, but Furutaka and Kako were eventually upgraded with twin turrets in 1937 when all four ships received 203mm main guns.

The modifications were significant. The six  semi-turrets, 1 through 6, were replaced by three twin turrets, two fore and one aft. The main superstructure was also modified to accommodate the different fire control requirements of the twin turrets. Other design modifications included using /45-cal HA guns rather than the  guns. The airplane takeoff platform, part of which mounted atop the number 4 semi-turret, was replaced with a catapult fitted just fore of the No.3 twin turret. The superstructure aft of the funnels was extensively modified due to the new catapult. The catapults weren't ready before the ships were commissioned. Kinugasa had a compressed-air unit mounted in March 1928, while Aoba had a gunpowder-propelled model mounted in March 1929.

Aoba and Kinugasa were otherwise built on the same hull as Furutaka and Kako, with identical machinery and armor.

As built the Aoba was more than 900 tons heavier than its design weight, with negative effects on the performance of the ships similar to that of the Furutaka class overweight condition.

Modernization
In 1930, the Naval General Staff, concerned by the limitations on the size of their navy by the London Naval Treaty won approval for an extensive modernization program of the "A class" cruisers. To offset the numerical superiority the U.S. Navy enjoyed, the planned upgrades included the latest weapons, protection, fire control systems, and communication equipment.

In the spring of 1930 the two ships had their manually-operated 12 cm anti-aircraft guns replaced with improved electro-hydraulically operated units. Kinugasa was refitted with a gunpowder-propelled catapult a year later.

Extensive modernization of the ships began in late 1938, lasting until they were recommissioned two years later, as follows:

The  main battery was replaced by /50-cal Mark II guns. Although turrets and gun mounts were unchanged, the powder and shell hoists were modified for the larger shells and to prevent flarebacks in the turrets from traveling to the magazines. Light anti-aircraft defenses were improved by 4 twin sets of 25 mm machine guns and 2 twin  machine guns. The 6 pairs (3 per side) of fixed torpedo tubes mounted on the middle deck were replaced with 2 quadruple mounts using the powerful Type 93 torpedo, located on the upper deck, one on each side of the catapult.

The bridge structure was rebuilt almost identically to the Furutaka class modifications to accommodate the latest rangefinders and fire control equipment for the main battery, antiaircraft and torpedoes.

Of the twelve original boilers, two smaller ones were mixed-fuel capable. They were replaced with oil-fired units. Their coal bunkers were replaced with fuel-oil tanks.

The above modifications added 576 tons to the ships. To prevent the draft from increasing even more, and to improve stability, bulges were added, simultaneously enhancing anti-torpedo protection.

Ships in class

References

Books

External links

Aoba
 
Cruisers of the Imperial Japanese Navy
Ships built in Japan